The  is a museum in Tagajō, Miyagi Prefecture, Japan. It houses finds from excavations at the site of Tagajō as well as from other archaeological sites in the Tōhoku region of northern Japan.

These include a Jōmon period jade axe excavated in Kizukuri, Aomori Prefecture, and designated an Important Cultural Property; and another Jōmon jade, excavated in Niisato, Iwate Prefecture, also designated an Important Cultural Property.

See also
Site of Tagajō
Japanese museums

References

External links

 

Museums in Miyagi Prefecture
Archaeological museums in Japan
Tagajō, Miyagi